André Luiz Ladaga, most commonly known as Andrezinho (born 19 February 1975 in Rio de Janeiro) is a retired naturalized Azerbaijani football midfielder. His last known club was Karvan. He represented the Azerbaijani national side between 2006 and 2008.

Career
In the summer of 2004 Andrezinho moved to Baku of the Azerbaijan Premier League. He made 80 league appearances for Baku before leaving at the end of the 2007–08 season. In the summer of 2009 Andrezinho joined Karvan, making 2 appearances before leaving in January 2010.

International career
Andrezinho gained Azerbaijani citizenship in 2006, and went on to make his debut for the Azerbaijani team on 2 September 2006 against Serbia and Montenegro. He made a total of 13 appearances for Azerbaijan in two years scoring once, in a Euro 2008 qualifier against Kazakhstan on 6 September 2006.

Career statistics

Club

International

References

Honours
 FC Baku
Azerbaijan Premier League
Winner (1): 2005–06

External links

1975 births
Living people
Footballers from Rio de Janeiro (city)
Brazilian footballers
Naturalized citizens of Azerbaijan
Azerbaijani footballers
Azerbaijan international footballers
Association football midfielders
CR Vasco da Gama players
Fluminense FC players
Madureira Esporte Clube players
Olaria Atlético Clube players
América Futebol Clube (RN) players
Associação Atlética Anapolina players
FC Baku players
FK Karvan players
Azerbaijan Premier League players
Brazilian expatriate footballers
Brazilian emigrants to Azerbaijan